El Maris is a suburb of al Uqsur, in Egypt. It is part of the Luxor Governorate.

Populated places in Luxor Governorate